Kohgiluyeh County is in Kohgiluyeh and Boyer-Ahmad province, Iran. The capital of the county is the city of Dehdasht. At the 2006 census, the county's population was 189,939 in 36,038 households. The following census in 2011 counted 153,695 people in 33,589 households, by which time Charam and Sarfaryab Districts had been separated from the county to form Charam County. At the 2016 census, the county's population was 131,351 in 32,457 households, by which time Landeh District had been separated from the county to form Landeh County.

Administrative divisions

The population history and structural changes of Kohgiluyeh County's administrative divisions over three consecutive censuses are shown in the following table. The latest census shows four districts, 10 rural districts, and four cities.

References

 

Counties of Kohgiluyeh and Boyer-Ahmad Province